Tynychbek Abdymalikovich Akmatbayev (January 30, 1962 – October 20, 2005) was a member of parliament in Kyrgyzstan and head of the parliamentary law enforcement committee. Akmatbayev was killed by inmates (Aziz Batukayev) at the Moldavanovka prison on October 20, 2005, while investigating unrest at the prison northwest of Bishkek. Akmatbayev's killing prompted prison guards to pull out of Moldavanovka and other prisons, leaving inmates in control. 

The death of Akmatbayev was the third killing of a Kyrgyz MP since the  Tulip Revolution in March 2005. Akmatbayev's brother, Ryspek, led public accusations that the prime minister, Felix Kulov, might have been linked to the killing. Kulov denied the allegation.

Less than a year after his death, his brother Rysbek Akmatbayev was killed on 10 May 2006 in a drive-by shooting.

References
"Mutinous prisoners kill Kyrgyz MP", Al Jazeera, October 21, 2005, retrieved December 22, 2005.
"Kyrgyz killing raises mafia fears" by Malcolm Haslett, BBC News, October 25, 2005, retrieved December 22, 2005.
"Kyrgyz jail unrest claims lives", BBC News, November 1, 2005, retrieved December 22, 2005.

1962 births
2005 deaths 
2005 crimes in Kyrgyzstan 
2000s murders in Kyrgyzstan 
Kyrgyzstani murder victims
People murdered in Kyrgyzstan
People murdered by Russian-speaking organized crime
Kyrgyzstani legislators